Randi Charno Levine is an American author, arts advocate, and diplomat who currently serves as the United States ambassador to Portugal.

Education 
Levine earned a Bachelor of Arts degree from the Missouri School of Journalism.

Career 
Levin has been a member of advisory and governing boards for several organizations, including the Barbara and Edward Netter Center for Community Partnerships, Hamptons International Film Festival, John and Doris Norton School of Family and Consumer Sciences, Roundabout Theatre Company, NYU Langone Health, High Line, Anna Wintour Costume Center, National Portrait Gallery, New Museum, and Meridian International Center.

Ambassador to Portugal
On October 29, 2021, President Joe Biden nominated Levine to be the ambassador to Portugal. Hearings on her nomination were held before the Senate Foreign Relations Committee on February 8, 2022. The committee favorably reported her nomination to the Senate floor on March 8, 2022. The entire Senate confirmed Levine by voice vote on March 10, 2022. She presented her credentials to President Marcelo Rebelo de Sousa on April 22, 2022.

Personal life 
Levine's husband, Jeffrey E. Levine, is the founder of Douglaston Development and Levine Builders. He has also worked as the president of the Jewish National Fund–USA. Levine has three children.

References

External links

Year of birth missing (living people)
Living people
Ambassadors of the United States to Portugal
American women ambassadors
Cultural diplomacy
Missouri School of Journalism alumni
Philanthropists from New York (state)
University of Missouri alumni
American women diplomats